Ilan Pappé (born 7 November 1954) is an expatriate Israeli historian and socialist activist. He is a professor with the College of Social Sciences and International Studies at the University of Exeter in the United Kingdom, director of the university's European Centre for Palestine Studies, and co-director of the Exeter Centre for Ethno-Political Studies.

Pappé was born in Haifa, Israel. Prior to coming to the UK, he was a senior lecturer in political science at the University of Haifa (1984–2007) and chair of the Emil Touma Institute for Palestinian and Israeli Studies in Haifa (2000–2008). He is the author of Ten Myths About Israel (2017), The Ethnic Cleansing of Palestine (2006), The Modern Middle East (2005), A History of Modern Palestine: One Land, Two Peoples (2003), and Britain and the Arab-Israeli Conflict (1988). He was also a leading member of Hadash, and was a candidate on the party list in the 1996 and 1999 Knesset elections.

Pappé is one of Israel's New Historians who, since the release of pertinent British and Israeli government documents in the early 1980s, have offered an unconventional view of Israel's creation in 1948, and the corresponding expulsion or flight of 700,000 Palestinians in the same year. He has written that the expulsions were not decided on an ad hoc basis, as other historians have argued, but constituted the ethnic cleansing of Palestine, in accordance with Plan Dalet, drawn up in 1947 by Israel's future leaders. He blames the creation of Israel for the lack of peace in the Middle East, arguing that Zionism is more dangerous than Islamic militancy, and has called for an international boycott of Israeli academics.

Pappé supports the one-state solution, which envisages a unitary state for Palestinians and Israelis.

His work has been both supported and criticized by other historians. Before he left Israel in 2008, he had been condemned in the Knesset, Israel's parliament; a minister of education had called for him to be sacked; his photograph had appeared in a newspaper at the centre of a target; and he had received several death threats.

Early life and education
Pappé was born in Haifa, Israel, to German Jewish parents who fled Nazi persecution in the 1930s. At the age of 18, he was drafted into the Israel Defense Forces, serving in the Golan Heights during the 1973 Yom Kippur War. He graduated from the Hebrew University of Jerusalem in 1978, and in 1984 obtained his PhD in history from the University of Oxford, under the guidance of Albert Hourani and Roger Owen. His doctoral thesis became his first book, Britain and the Arab-Israeli Conflict.

Academic career

Pappé was a senior lecturer at the Middle Eastern History Department and the Political Science Department of the University of Haifa between 1984 and 2006. He was the Academic Director of the Research Institute for Peace at Givat Haviva from 1993 to 2000, and chair of the Emil Touma Institute for Palestinian Studies.

Pappé left Israel in 2007 to take up his appointment in Exeter, after his endorsement of the boycott of Israeli universities led the president of the University of Haifa to call for his resignation. Pappé said that he found it "increasingly difficult to live in Israel" with his "unwelcome views and convictions." In a Qatari newspaper interview explaining his decision, he said: "I was boycotted in my university and there had been attempts to expel me from my job. I am getting threatening calls from people every day. I am not being viewed as a threat to the Israeli society but my people think that I am either insane or my views are irrelevant. Many Israelis also believe that I am working as a mercenary for the Arabs."

Katz controversy

Pappé publicly supported an M.A. thesis by Haifa University student Teddy Katz, which was approved with highest honors, that claimed Israel had committed a massacre in the Palestinian village of Tantura during the war in 1948, based upon interviews with Arab residents of the village and with an Israeli veteran of the operation. Neither Israeli nor Palestinian historians had previously recorded any such incident, which Meyrav Wurmser described as a "made-up massacre", but, according to Pappé, "the story of Tantura had already been told before, as early as 1950... It appears in the memoirs of a Haifa notable, Muhammad Nimr al-Khatib, who, a few days after the battle, recorded the testimony of a Palestinian." In December 2000, Katz was sued for libel by veterans of the Alexandroni Brigade and after the testimony was heard, he retracted his allegations about the massacre. Twelve hours later, he retracted his retraction. During the trial, lawyers for the veterans pointed to what they said were discrepancies between the taped interviews Katz conducted and descriptions in Katz's thesis.

Katz revised his thesis, and, following the trial, the university appointed a committee to examine it. After reviewing the taped interviews and finding discrepancies between them and what was written in the thesis, Katz was allowed to submit a revised thesis. Pappé continues to defend both Katz and his thesis. Tom Segev and others argued that there is merit or some truth in what Katz described. According to the Israeli New Historian Benny Morris: "There is no unequivocal proof of a large-scale massacre at Tantura, but war crimes were perpetrated there."

In January 2022, Alon Schwarz' film Tantura was shown at the 2022 Sundance Film Festival. In it, former Israeli soldiers admitted that a massacre did indeed take place in 1948 at Tantura.  “They silenced it,” one former combat soldier stated. The victims of the massacre were buried under what is today the Dor Beach parking lot, in an area measuring 35 x 4 meters. Adam Raz  noted in Haaretz that there had been a public debate about the issue, with Yoav Gelber trying to discredit Katz’s thesis,  while Pappé defended the thesis. Adam Raz  noted "With the appearance of the testimony in Schwarz’s film, the debate would seem to be decided."

Political activism
In 1999, Pappé ran in the Knesset elections as seventh on the Communist Party-led Hadash list.

After years of political activism, Pappé supports economic and political boycotts of Israel, including an academic boycott. He believes boycotts are justified because "the Israeli occupation is a dynamic process and it becomes worse with each passing day. The AUT can choose to stand by and do nothing, or to be part of a historical movement similar to the anti-apartheid campaign against the white supremacist regime in South Africa. By choosing the latter, it can move us forward along the only remaining viable and non-violent road to saving both Palestinians and Israelis from an impending catastrophe."

As a result, then University of Haifa President Aaron Ben-Ze'ev called on Pappé to resign, saying: "it is fitting for someone who calls for a boycott of his university to apply the boycott himself." He said that Pappé would not be ostracized, since that would undermine academic freedom, but he should leave voluntarily. In the same year, Pappé initiated the annual Israeli Right of return conferences, which called for the unconditional right of return of the Palestinian refugees who were expelled in 1948.

In August 2015, Pappé was a signatory to a letter criticising The Jewish Chronicles reporting of Jeremy Corbyn's association with alleged antisemites.

Critical assessment
Israeli scholar Emmanuel Sivan, reviewing Pappé's 2003 political biography of the al-Husayni family, praised the book's treatment of the development of Palestinian nationalism and that of Haj Amin's exile in Germany, but criticised the view taken on the mufti's visit to the German consul and the scant attention given to Faisal Husseini.

In a review for Arab Studies Quarterly, Seif Da'Na described Pappé's 2006 book The Ethnic Cleansing of Palestine as a "highly documented narrative of the events" surrounding the Nakba and an example of "serious scholarship that only a virtuoso historiographer could produce". Arab Studies Quarterly also praised Pappé's 2017 book Ten Myths About Israel, describing it as "well-documented" and an "invaluable and courageous contribution" from an "insightful" historian. In a review for the journal Global Governance, Rashmi Singh praised Pappé's 2014 book The Idea of Israel as a "courageous and unflinching study of the role of Zionism in the creation of [...] the state of Israel". However, Singh did feel that the book assumes the reader has prior knowledge of the Arab-Israeli conflict and thus may be difficult to follow for "those who are not conversant with the facts".

Uri Ram, a professor of Ben-Gurion University, reviewed The Ethnic Cleansing of Palestine for the Middle East Journal and described the book as "a most important and daring book that challenges head-on Israeli historiography and collective memory and even more importantly Israeli conscience". The same book was reviewed by Hugh Steadman for the New Zealand International Review, in which he called Pappé's book the "definitive record of the caesarean operation by which the state of Israel was born" and "essential reading" for those who wish to see a "peaceful and internationally acceptable Middle Eastern home for Jewish people".

Those critical of his work include Benny Morris (who described some of Pappé's writing as "complete fabrication" and said he was "at best...one of the world's sloppiest historians; at worst, one of the most dishonest"), Efraim Karsh, and activist Herbert London as well as professors Daniel Gutwein and Yossi Ben-Artzi from Haifa University. Pappé has replied to this criticism, condemning Morris for holding "abominable racist views about the Arabs in general and the Palestinians in particular."

In August 2021, following the translation of his book The Ethnic Cleansing of Palestine into Hebrew, the historian Adam Raz published a review in "Ha'aretz" criticizing Pappé as a historian whose work "suffers from negligence, manipulations and mistakes galore, and the result is not serious research". In the article, Raz presents various examples of "lies", inaccuracies, and the lack of sources for Pappé's various claims, the most prominent of which is the latter's claim that "rape took place in every village," without citing a source, while ignoring publications that contradict this claim, such as Tal Nitzan's study: "Boundaries of Occupation: The Rare of Military Rape in the Israeli-Palestinian Conflict". The title of the article "Selective Reading" refers, among other things, to such a reading of the diaries of Theodor Herzl and Ben-Gurion, Berl Katzenelson and Israel Galili. This critique is consistent with the critique of other historians such as Morris and Yoav Gelber.

Published work

Books
Ten Myths About Israel. New York: Verso. 2017. 
(with Noam Chomsky) 
 
 
 "The Boycott Will Work: An Israeli Perspective" in Audrea Lim (ed.) 
 
 (with Noam Chomsky) Gaza in Crisis: Reflections on Israel's War Against the Palestinians (Hamish Hamilton, 2010). 
 
 
 The Ethnic Cleansing of Palestine (London and New York: Oneworld, 2006). 
 The Modern Middle East (London and New York: Routledge, 2005). 
 A History of Modern Palestine: One Land, Two Peoples (Cambridge University Press, 2004), 
 (With Jamil Hilal). Parlare Con il Nemico, Narrazioni palestinesi e israeliane a confronto (Milano: Bollati Boringhieri, 2004).
 The Aristocracy: The Husaynis; A Political Biography (Jerusalem: Mossad Byalik, (Hebrew), 2003).
 The Israel-Palestine Question (London and New York: Routledge, 1999; 2006). 
 (with M. Maoz). History From Within: Politics and Ideas in Middle East (London and New York: Tauris, 1997). 
 (with J. Nevo). Jordan in the Middle East: The Making of a Pivotal State (London: Frank Cass, 1994). 
 The Making of the Arab-Israeli Conflict, 1947–1951 (London and New York: I.B. Tauris, 1992; 1994). 
 Britain and the Arab-Israeli Conflict, 1948–1951 (London: St. Antony's College Series, Macmillan Press; New York: St. Martin's Press, 1988).

Articles
 "What drives Israel?", Essay of the week, Herald Scotland (6 June 2010). [retrieved 23 February 2012].
 "Towards a Geography of Peace: Whither Gaza?", The Electronic Intifada (18 June 2007).
 "Calling a Spade a Spade: The 1948 Ethnic Cleansing of Palestine" , article in al-Majdal Magazine (Spring 2006). [retrieved 17 May 2007].
 "Back the boycott," The Guardian, (24 May 2005).
 "Haj Amin and the Buraq Revolt", Jerusalem Quarterly, Issue 18 (June 2003). [retrieved 23 February 2012]
 "The '48 Nakba & The Zionist Quest for its Completion" , Between The Lines (October 2002). [retrieved 23 February 2012].
 "The Husayni Family Faces New Challenges: Tanzimat, Young Turks, the Europeans and Zionism 1840–1922, Part II", Jerusalem Quarterly, Issue 11–12 (Winter-Spring 2001). [retrieved 23 February 2012]
 Ilan Pappé, "The Tantura Case in Israel: The Katz Research and Trial," Journal of Palestine Studies, Vol. 30, No. 3 (Spring 2001), pp. 19–39. [retrieved 23 February 2012].
 Ilan Pappé, "The Rise and Fall of the Husainis (Part 1)," Jerusalem Quarterly, Issue 10 (Autumn 2000).
 Ilan Pappé, "Review Essay, Israeli Television's Fiftieth Anniversary "Tekumma" Series: A Post-Zionist View?," Journal of Palestine Studies, Vol. 27, No. 4 (Summer 1998), pp. 99–105, Institute for Palestinian Studies.
 Ilan Pappé, Destruction of al-Aqsa is no conspiracy theory, The Electronic Intifada, 10 November 2015.

See also
Avi Shlaim

References

External links

 Ilan Pappe: The 10 Myths of Israel - Part 1  and Part 2 , a conversation with Max Blumenthal (2017-03-30), The Real News
     Talk by Ilan Pappe at Oxford University, February 2007
 Pappé speaking in Amsterdam on "The Ethnic Cleansing of Palestine", January 28, 2007 (broadcast on Flashpoints / KPFA-FM, Berkeley, 28 May 2007)
 "Power and History in the Middle East: A Conversation with Ilan Pappe", Logos, Winter 2004
 Interview with Ilan Pappé by LabourNet UK
 The Ethnic Cleansing of Palestine The borders of fact and myth By Stephen Howe 24 November 2006 The Independent
 SkyNews1 or Sky News2 — brief debate between Ilan Pappé and Ephraim Karsh on Sky News, 18 October 2006.
 "Post-Zionism Only Rings Once" — Neri Livneh
 Pappé refutes Chomsky on Israel's lobby
 Alone on the Barricades, Meron Rappaport interviews Ilan Pappé about Teddy Katz and the AUT boycott, Haaretz, 2005
 Nadim Mahjoub interviews Ilan Pappe on Ethnic Cleansing of Palestine, Resonance FM Radio, London, UK, 27 October 2006
 The Liar as a Hero , by Benny Morris, March 2011.
 Why Ilan Pappe Left Israel, Ceasefire Magazine

1954 births
Living people
Academics of the University of Exeter
Alumni of the University of Oxford
Hadash politicians
Hebrew University of Jerusalem alumni
Historians of the Middle East
Israeli anti-war activists
Israeli expatriates in the United Kingdom
Israeli historians
Israeli people of German-Jewish descent
Israeli political activists
Jewish historians
Jewish socialists
Jewish communists
Israeli communists
Israeli Marxists
Israeli socialists
Jewish anti-Zionism in the United Kingdom
Anti-Zionist Jews
New Historians
People from Haifa